IFRF is an acronym and may refer to:

 ISKCON Food Relief Foundation
 International Flame Research Foundation